Courts of Arizona include:
;State courts of Arizona
Arizona Supreme Court
Arizona Court of Appeals (2 divisions)
Superior Court of Arizona (15 counties)
Justices of the Peace (county courts)  and Arizona Municipal Courts, city trial courts and courts of limited jurisdiction

Federal courts located in Arizona
United States District Court for the District of Arizona

References

External links
National Center for State Courts – directory of state court websites.

Courts in the United States